Prolyl endopeptidase (PE) also known as prolyl oligopeptidase or post-proline cleaving enzyme is an enzyme that in humans is encoded by the PREP gene.

Function 

Prolyl endopeptidase is a large cytosolic enzyme that belongs to a distinct class of serine peptidases. It was first described in the cytosol of rabbit brain as an oligopeptidase, which degrades the nonapeptide bradykinin at the Pro-Phe bond. The enzyme is involved in the maturation and degradation of peptide hormones and neuropeptides such as alpha-melanocyte-stimulating hormone, luteinizing hormone-releasing hormone (LH-RH), thyrotropin-releasing hormone, angiotensin, neurotensin, oxytocin, substance P and vasopressin. PREP cleaves peptide bonds at the C-terminal side of proline residues. Its activity is confined to action on oligopeptides of less than 10 kD and it has an absolute requirement for the trans-configuration of the peptide bond preceding proline.

Prolyl endopeptidases are involved in the maturation and degradation of peptide hormones and neuropeptides.

Structure 

Prolyl endopeptidase is a cytosolic prolyl endopeptidase that cleaves peptide bonds on the C-terminal side of prolyl residues within peptides that are up to approximately 30 amino acids long. Only short protein residues are able to enter the active site of prolyl endopeptidase due to the distinct beta-propeller region that acts as a gating filter mechanism.

Clinical significance 

Altered PREP activity may be associated with autism spectrum disorders and various psychological diseases such as schizophrenia, mania and clinical depression.

However, there is conflicting information as to the exact role that prolyl endopeptidase plays in the pathophysiology of depression, with earlier studies documenting a decreased activity of the enzyme in depressed patients, but more recent studies demonstrating that inhibition of the same enzyme actually results in alleviation of depressive symptoms.

Some types of prolyl endopeptidase have been used in studies to decrease the propensity of gluten-containing wheat products to aggravate coeliac disease. However, orally administered enzymes are potentially subject to inactivation in the gastrointestinal tract.

Inhibitors 

Several prolyl endopeptidase inhibitors are known, and have been suggested as possible nootropic and antidepressant drugs. Notable compounds include:

 Pramiracetam
 Baicalin
 JTP-4819
 KYP-2047
 S-17092
 Berberine

References

External links
 
 Prolyl Endopeptidase entry at the National Center for Biotechnology Information
 PDBe-KB provides an overview of all the structure information available in the PDB for Human Prolyl endopeptidase

EC 3.4.21